La Americana is a feature documentary film directed and produced by Nicholas Bruckman. The film tells the story of a young undocumented immigrant in New York City who struggles to save the life of her ailing daughter in Bolivia.
La Americana received numerous festival awards worldwide, including best documentary at the New York and Los Angeles Latino film festivals.

The film was broadcast on numerous television networks in Europe, Asia, and Latin America, and in 2012 aired nationwide in the US on National Geographic Mundo.

References

External links 
Official Website
La Americana at Al Jazeera
La Americana at The Lancet Journal 
La Americana at Short Films Texas
La Americana at The Orlando Sentinel
La Americana at Orlando Weekly

Documentary films about immigration to the United States